Greenburg is a surname. Notable people with the name include:

 Adrian Greenburg (1903–1959), American costume designer
 Earl Greenburg (1947–2008), former head of NBC Daytime
 Dan Greenburg (born 1936), American author and screenwriter
 Jack Carl Greenburg (1909–1990), Los Angeles attorney
 Jan Crawford Greenburg (born 1965), legal correspondent for ABC News
 J. C. Greenburg, author of the Andrew Lost children's books
 Jennifer Greenburg (born 1977), American photographer
 Ross Greenburg (born c. 1955), president of HBO Sports
 Zack O'Malley Greenburg (born 1985), American writer

See also 
 Greensburg (disambiguation)
 Greenberg
 Grünburg